99 Live is a live album by former Guns N' Roses guitarist Gilby Clarke.  Recorded live in Hollywood, California the album was released in 1999.

Track listing

Personnel

Gilby Clarke – lead vocals, rhythm guitar
Tracii Guns – lead guitar
Stefan Adika – bass guitar
Eric Singer – drums

References

Gilby Clarke albums
1999 live albums